Lunar treaty may refer to:
Outer Space Treaty, 1967, formally the Treaty on Principles Governing the Activities of States in the Exploration and Use of Outer Space, including the Moon and Other Celestial Bodies
Moon Treaty, 1979, formally the Agreement Governing the Activities of States on the Moon and Other Celestial Bodies